Congenital malaria is an extremely rare condition which occurs due to transplacental transmission of maternal infection.

Clinical features include fever, irritability, feeding problems, anemia, hepatosplenomegaly and jaundice. Clinical features commence only after three weeks due to the protective effect of transplacentally transmitted antibodies.

References

External links
 Congenital falciparum malaria
 Other congenital malaria

Congenital disorders